Mikko Niemi may refer to:

Mikko Niemi (basketball) (born 1985), Finnish basketball player
Mikko Niemi (ice hockey) (born 1972), Finnish ice hockey player